CHPV-FM was a French language Christian radio station that operates at 103.7 FM in Scotstown, Quebec, Canada.

Owned by La Fabrique de la Paroisse de Saint-Paul, the station received CRTC approval in 2000.

References

External links
 

Hpv
Hpv
Radio stations established in 2000
Radio stations disestablished in 2021
2000 establishments in Quebec
2021 disestablishments in Quebec
HPV
HPV